Frederick A. Lyon (June 25, 1843 – September 23, 1911) was a soldier in the Union Army and a Medal of Honor recipient for his actions in the American Civil War.

Medal of Honor citation
Rank and organization: corporal, Company A, First Vermont Cavalry. Place and date: At Cedar Creek, Va., October 19, 1864. Entered service at: Burlington, Vt. Born: June 25, 1843, Williamsburg, Mass. Date of issue: November 26, 1864.

Citation:

With 1 companion, captured the flag of a Confederate regiment, 3 officers, and an ambulance with its mules and driver.

The companion mentioned in his citation was private James Sweeney, who also received the Medal of Honor. One of the captured officers was the mortally wounded general Stephen Dodson Ramseur, who died the next day.

Lyon was sent to Washington, D.C. with the captured Confederate battle flag. He was personally introduced to Secretary of War Edwin M. Stanton by General George Custer. Stanton personally presented the Medal of Honor to Lyon, who was also promoted to sergeant.

Death
Lyon died on 23 September, 1911 in Jackson, Michigan. He was buried nearby in Mount Evergreen Cemetery (Soldier's field G-9).

See also

 List of Medal of Honor recipients
 List of American Civil War Medal of Honor recipients: G–L

References

External links
 
 Vermont in the Civil War

1843 births
1911 deaths
United States Army Medal of Honor recipients
United States Army soldiers
People of Massachusetts in the American Civil War
American Civil War recipients of the Medal of Honor
People from Williamsburg, Massachusetts